The women's floor competition at the 2016 Summer Olympics was held at the HSBC Arena on 16 August.

Simone Biles and Aly Raisman of the United States finished first and second in qualifications and then won the gold and silver medals in the event final. Raisman was the defending Olympic champion on floor. For Biles, it was her fourth gold medal and fifth overall medal of the 2016 Olympics.

Competition format
The top 8 qualifiers in the qualification phase (limit two per NOC), based on combined score of each apparatus, advanced to the individual all-around final. The finalists performed on each apparatus again. Qualification scores were then ignored, with only final round scores counting.

Qualification

The gymnasts who rank in the top eight qualify for the final round, with a maximum of two gymnasts from any single NOC eligible to move to the finals. When more than two competitors from one country finish in the top eight, the gymnast(s) who are third or lower ranked from that country are replaced by the next best ranking gymnast. 

Only two gymnasts from each country may advance to the floor exercise final. Therefore, in some cases, a third and/or fourth gymnast placed high enough to qualify, but did not advance to the final because of the quota. Gymnasts who did not advance to the final, but had high enough scores to do so were:	
  (4th place)
  (9th place)

Final

The medals were presented by Larry Probst, IOC member, and Ali Zaater, FIG Executive Committee Member.

References

 https://www.olympic.org/rio-2016/gymnastics-artistic/floor-exercises-women
 https://www.bbc.co.uk/sport/olympics/rio-2016/results/sports/gymnastics/womens-floor-exercise

Women's floor
2016
2016 in women's gymnastics
Women's events at the 2016 Summer Olympics